Gruffydd ap Llywelyn (  5 August 1063) was King of Wales from 1055 to 1063. He had previously been King of Gwynedd and Powys in 1039. He was the son of King Llywelyn ap Seisyll and Angharad daughter of Maredudd ab Owain, and the great-great-grandson of Hywel Dda.

Genealogy and early life
Gruffydd was the son of Llywelyn ap Seisyll, who had been able to rule both Gwynedd and Powys, and Angharad ferch Maredudd. On Llywelyn's death in 1023, a member of the Aberffraw dynasty, Iago ab Idwal ap Meurig, became ruler of Gwynedd and began his rise to power in Powys.

King of Gwynedd and Powys (1039–1055)

In 1039, King Iago of Gwynedd was killed (supposedly by his own men), which made Gruffudd King. His son Cynan, was forced into exile in Dublin. Soon after gaining power, he surprised a Mercian army at Rhyd y Groes near Welshpool and defeated it, killing Edwin, brother of Leofric, Earl of Mercia. He then attacked Dyfed, which his father had ruled but was now under Hywel ab Edwin. Gruffydd again defeated Hywel in the Battle of Pencader in 1041 (halfway between Carmarthen and Lampeter but didn't win entirely until 1042 at 'Pwlldyfach' (near Carmarthen ). and carried off Hywel's wife. Gruffydd seems to have been able to drive Hywel (and his Irish fleet of 'Black Gentiles / Pagans') out of the south, for in 1044 Hywel is again recorded returning to River Towy with a fleet from Ireland, Gruffydd, however, defeated and killed Hywel.

Gruffydd ap Rhydderch of Gwent was able to expel Gruffydd ap Llywelyn from Deheubarth in 1047 and became king of Deheubarth himself. Afterwards the nobles of Ystrad Tywi had attacked and killed 140 of Gruffydd ap Llywelyn's household guard, Gruffydd exacted his revenge in Towy and Dyfed. Gruffydd ap Llywelyn was active on the Welsh border in 1052, when he attacked Herefordshire with an army consisting of a fleet of 18 ships from Ireland, they defeated a mixed force of Normans and English in the Battle of Leominster.

King of Wales (1055–1063)

According to Brut y Tywysogion, Sweyn Godwinson was called in to help Gruffydd's brother Rhys against Gruffydd ap Rhydderch in 1045 to keep hold of Deheubarth. Gruffydd raided Leominster in 1052, which was the Battle of Llanllieni, the Welsh fought Normans and Anglo Saxons.

In 1055 Gruffydd ap Llywelyn killed his rival Gruffydd ap Rhydderch in battle and recaptured Deheubarth. Gruffydd allied himself with Ælfgar, son of Leofric, Earl of Mercia, who had been deprived of his earldom of East Anglia by Harold Godwinson and his brothers. They marched on Hereford and were opposed by a force led by the Earl of Hereford, Ralph the Timid, then set Hereford on fire. This force was mounted and armed in the Norman fashion, but on 24 October Gruffydd and Ælfgar defeated it. They then sacked the city and destroyed its motte-and-bailey castle. Earl Harold was given the task of counter-attacking, but Gruffydd and Ælfgar had retreated to south Wales whilst Harold didn't venture further than Hereford. He seems here to have built a fortification at Longtown in Herefordshire before refortifying Hereford. Shortly afterwards, Ælfgar was restored to his earldom and a peace treaty concluded.

Around this time Gruffydd was also able to seize Morgannwg and Gwent, along with extensive territories along the border with England. Now recognized as King of Wales, he claimed sovereignty over the whole of the country – a claim which was recognised by the English.

Historian John Davies stated that Gruffydd was, 
"the only Welsh king ever to rule over the entire territory of Wales... Thus, from about 1057 until his death in 1063, the whole of Wales recognised the kingship of Gruffudd ap Llywelyn. For about seven brief years, Wales was one, under one ruler, a feat with neither precedent nor successor." During this time, between 1053 and 1063, Wales lacked any internal strife and was at peace.

Death and aftermath
Gruffydd reached an agreement with Edward the Confessor, but the death of his ally Ælfgar in 1062 left him more vulnerable. In late 1062 Harold Godwinson obtained the English king's approval for a surprise attack on Gruffydd's court at Rhuddlan. Gruffydd was nearly captured, but was warned in time to escape out to sea in one of his ships, though his other ships were destroyed. In the spring of 1063 Harold's brother Tostig led an army into north Wales while Harold led the fleet first to south Wales and then north to meet with his brother's army. Gruffydd was forced to take refuge in Snowdonia where he met his death. Gruffydd's head and the figurehead of his ship were sent to Harold. The Ulster Chronicle states that he was killed by Cynan in 1064, whose father Iago had been put to death by Gruffydd in 1039. Gruffydd had probably made enemies in the course of uniting Wales under his rule. According to Walter Map, Gruffydd said of this:
"Speak not of killing; I but blunt the horns of the offspring of Wales lest they should injure their dam."

Following Gruffydd's death, Harold married his widow Ealdgyth, though she was to be widowed again three years later. Gruffydd's realm was divided again into the traditional kingdoms. Bleddyn ap Cynfyn and his brother Rhiwallon came to an agreement with Harold and were given the rule of Gwynedd and Powys. Thus when Harold was defeated and killed at the Battle of Hastings in 1066, the Normans reaching the borders of Wales were confronted by the traditional kingdoms rather than a single king. Gruffydd left two sons who in 1069 challenged Bleddyn and Rhiwallon at the battle of Mechain in an attempt to win back part of their father's kingdom. However they were defeated, one being killed and the other dying of exposure after the battle.

Family
Gruffydd married Ealdgyth, daughter of Earl Ælfgar of Mercia after his abduction of, and marriage to, the unnamed wife of Hywel ab Edwin in 1041. Gruffydd had at least three children, two sons called Maredudd and Idwal, both of whom died at the Battle of Mechain in 1069, and a daughter called Nest verch Gruffydd who married Osbern fitzRichard of Richard's Castle. Their daughter Nest ferch Osbern (aka Nesta of Hereford) married Bernard de Neufmarché. He may have had another son, Owain ap Gruffudd, who died in 1059.

References

Sources

Note

External links

1010 births
1063 deaths
Year of birth uncertain
House of Aberffraw
Monarchs of Gwynedd
Monarchs of Gwent
11th-century Welsh monarchs
Monarchs of Glywysing